Lac-Saint-Jean is a federal electoral district in the Saguenay–Lac-Saint-Jean region, northeast Quebec, Canada, that was represented in the House of Commons of Canada from 1925 to 2004, and has been represented since 2015.

Demographics
According to the Canada 2021 Census

Ethnocultural groups: 92% White, 6.9% Indigenous
Languages: 98.5% French
Religions: 83.3% Christian (76.3% Catholic), 16.2% No Religion
Median income: $38,800 (2020)

History
This riding was created in 1924 form parts of Chicoutimi—Saguenay riding and was originally named in English Lake St. John. It originally consisted of the counties of Lake St. John East and Lake St. John West. It was renamed Lake St-John—Roberval in 1935.

The 1947 redistribution created a new riding with the name Lac-Saint-Jean (in English and French), created from parts of the Lake St-John—Roberval riding. It was initially defined to consist of the county of Lake St. John East and the towns of Riverbend, Ile Maligne and St. Joseph-d'Alma; and parts of the county of Lake St. John West.

In 1966, it was redefined to consist of the City of Alma, the Town of Desbiens, the County of Lac-Saint-Jean East, and parts of the Counties of Lac-Saint-Jean West and Chicoutimi.

In 1976, it was redefined to consist of the Cities of Alma and Chicoutimi North, and parts of the Counties of Chicoutimi and Lac-Saint-Jean East.

In 1987, it was redefined to consist of the towns of Alma, Desbiens and Métabetchouan; the County of Lac-Saint-Jean-Est; and parts of the Counties of Chicoutimi, Charlevoix-Ouest, Lac-Saint-Jean-Ouest and Montmorency.

In 1996, it was redefined to consist of the towns of Alma, Desbiens and Métabetchouan; the County Regional Municipality of Lac-Saint-Jean-Est; and parts of in the County Regional Municipality of Le Fjord-du-Saguenay.

Its name was changed in 2000 to "Lac-Saint-Jean—Saguenay".

In 2003, it was abolished when it was redistributed into Chicoutimi—Le Fjord, Jonquière—Alma and Roberval ridings.

The 2012 electoral redistribution saw this riding re-created from parts of Roberval—Lac-Saint-Jean and Jonquière—Alma.

A by-election was held on October 23, 2017 due to the resignation of Denis Lebel on August 9, 2017. The riding was subsequently won by Liberal Richard Hébert.

Members of Parliament
This riding has elected the following Members of Parliament:

Election results

Lac-Saint-Jean, 2015–present

Lac-Saint-Jean—Saguenay, 2000–2004

Lac-Saint-Jean, 1949–2000

Lake St-John—Roberval, 1935–1949

Lake St. John (1925–1935)

See also 

 List of Canadian federal electoral districts
 Past Canadian electoral districts

References

External links 

Riding history from the Library of Parliament:
Lac-Saint-Jean
Lac-Saint-Jean—Saguenay
Lake_St-John—Roberval Riding history from the Library of Parliament
Lake St. John Riding history from the Library of Parliament

Quebec federal electoral districts
Alma, Quebec
Dolbeau-Mistassini
Roberval, Quebec